Thanh Tân or Thanh Tan can refer some populated places in Vietnam as

 Thanh Tân, Thái Bình, a commune in Kiến Xương District
 Thanh Tân, Bến Tre, a commune in Mỏ Cày Bắc District
 Thanh Tân, Thanh Hóa, a commune in Như Thanh District
 Thanh Tân, Hà Nam, a commune in Thanh Liêm District

Thạnh Tân 
 Thạnh Tân, Tiền Giang, a commune in Tân Phước District
 Thạnh Tân, Tây Ninh, a commune in Tây Ninh city
 Thạnh Tân, Sóc Trăng, a commune in Thạnh Trị District

Thành Tân 
Thành Tân, a commune in Thạch Thành District, Thanh Hóa Province

See also 
 Tan Thanh (disambiguation)